Jayce is a first name that is often an abbreviation of Jason.  Notable people and fictional characters with the name include:

People
Jayce Andrade (born 1984), Venezuelan volleyball player
Jayce Fincher, bassist of the rock group Marvelous 3
Jayce Hawryluk (born 1996), Canadian ice hockey player
Jayce Landberg, Swedish musician and novelist
Jayce Olivero (born 1998), Gibraltarian footballer
Jayce Lewis (born 1984), Welsh musician
Jayce Tingler (born 1980), American baseball manager

Fictional characters

the title character of Jayce and the Wheeled Warriors, a 1980s cartoon series
the hero of Jayce and the Wheeled Warriors
Jayce, the Defender of Tomorrow, a playable champion character in the multiplayer online battle arena video game League of Legends

See also
Jace, given name
Jaycee (given name)
Jajce, Bosnia, sometimes spelt Jayce 

English masculine given names